MCC Aviation SA (sometimes Mcc) is a Swiss aircraft manufacturer based in Grandvaux. The company specializes in the design and manufacture of paragliders in the form of ready-to-fly aircraft, as well as paragliding harnesses, rescue parachutes and paragliding accessories.

The company is a Société Anonyme, a Swiss limited company.

The company introduced the intermediate Boléa, designed by Paul Amiell, in the mid-2000s and then expanded the range to include higher performance gliders and two-seaters.

MCC's production facility is ISO 9001-2001 certified.

Aircraft 

Summary of aircraft built by MCC:
MCC Amaya
MCC Arolla
MCC Beluga
MCC Boléa
MCC Insigia
MCC Maluga
MCC Orbea

References

External links

Aircraft manufacturers of Switzerland
Paragliders